Kangaloon  is a village in the Southern Highlands of New South Wales, Australia, in Wingecarribee Shire. 

At the 2021 census, there were 206 residents.

Etymology
Kangaloon is Aboriginal for "kangaroo landing ground".

Notable people

 Michelle Bridges

References 

Towns of the Southern Highlands (New South Wales)